Jill E. Sommers was sworn in as a commissioner of the Commodity Futures Trading Commission on August 8, 2007 to a term that expired April 13, 2009. She was nominated on July 20, 2009 by President Barack Obama to serve a five-year second term., and confirmed by the United States Senate on October 8, 2009.

Commission posts

Global Markets Advisory Committee
On February 4, 2008 the commission appointed Sommers to serve as chairman and designated federal official of the Global Markets Advisory Committee, which meets periodically to discuss issues of concern to exchanges, firms, market users and the commission regarding the regulatory challenges of a global marketplace.

Financial Literacy and Education Commission
She also serves as the commission designee to the Financial Literacy and Education Commission, which is chaired by the secretary of the treasury and was established to improve the financial literacy and education of U.S. citizens.

Career
Commissioner Sommers has worked in the commodity futures and options industry in a variety of capacities throughout her career. In 2005 she was the policy director and head of government affairs for the International Swaps and Derivatives Association, where she worked on a number of over-the-counter derivatives issues.

Prior to that, Sommers worked in the Government Affairs Office of the Chicago Mercantile Exchange (CME), where she was instrumental in overseeing regulatory and legislative affairs for the exchange. During her tenure with the CME, she had the opportunity to work closely with congressional staff drafting the Commodity Futures Modernization Act of 2000.

Sommers started her career in Washington in 1991 as an intern for Senator Robert J. Dole (R-KS), working in various capacities until 1995. She later worked as a legislative aide for two consulting firms specializing in agricultural issues, Clark & Muldoon, P.C. and Taggart and Associates.

Personal information
A native of Fort Scott, Kansas, Sommers holds a bachelor of arts degree from the University of Kansas. Her husband, Mike Sommers, is president and CEO of the American Petroleum Institute and former chief of staff to Speaker of the United States House of Representatives John Boehner.

References

External links
Commodity Futures Trading Commission Website

Living people
Commodity Futures Trading Commission personnel
University of Kansas alumni
1969 births
George W. Bush administration personnel
Obama administration personnel